Mid-term parliamentary elections were held in Cuba on 1 November 1922 in order to fill half the seats in the House of Representatives. The Liberal Party was the biggest winner, taking 28 of the 57 seats.

Results

References

Cuba
Parliamentary elections in Cuba
1922 in Cuba
November 1922 events
Election and referendum articles with incomplete results